J. Eastburn Barn is a historic barn located near Newark, New Castle County, Delaware.  It was built about 1809, and is a bi-level, stone structure with a frame front wall and a
recessed stable wall.  It is constructed of light-colored fieldstone with large, roughly dressed, rectangular fieldstone quoins.  The barn measures 37 feet by 52 feet.

It was added to the National Register of Historic Places in 1986.

References

Barns on the National Register of Historic Places in Delaware
Buildings and structures completed in 1809
Buildings and structures in New Castle County, Delaware
National Register of Historic Places in New Castle County, Delaware